Razpotje south of Srednja Kanomlja in the Municipality of Idrija, Slovenia.  It is a popular excursion destination.

Name
The name Razpotje literally means 'crossroads'; routes to Srednja Kanomlja, Idrija, and various hamlets meet in the village. The village was formerly known as Kanomeljsko Razpotje (literally, 'Kanomlja crossroads') when it was a hamlet of Srednja Kanomlja.

History
The territory of Razpotje was part of Spodnja Kanomlja and Srednja Kanomlja until 2006, when it was made a separate village.

References

External links
Razpotje on Geopedia

Populated places in the Municipality of Idrija
Populated places established in 2006